Peter Dowdeswell, born in London on 29 July 1940, is an English gourmand. He is among the most successful competitive eaters in the recorded history of the sport. During the period when the Guinness Book of World Records kept data, Dowdeswell held more speed records than any other person, including records for the drinking of ale and the eating of eggs (hard-boiled, soft-boiled, and raw) and Cheddar cheese.

Dowdeswell accomplished most of his feats for charity, he says, rather than for record-breaking or insatiable hunger. Dowdeswell raised over £4.2 million for charity through eating and is renowned for being the father of record breakers.

He has appeared on several shows, including: David Letterman, This Morning, Jon Richardson's: How to Survive the End of the World and others.

World records 
 Large sausage: 60 in 36 seconds 
 The fastest drinking of a yard of ale: 4.9 seconds

See also
 List of competitive eaters

References 
 Peter Dowdeswell – Drinking, Eating, World Record, Record Holders Republic (per 17 May 2019)

The TV show was a small series of documentaries titled 'Champions'. Peter Dowdswell had a programme entirely devoted to himself and his various eating and drinking records and attempts. The programmed screened in the early 1980s I believe.

English competitive eaters
1940 births
Living people